Westminster Christian School is a private Christian school in Elgin, Illinois. The school is a ministry of the Westminster Presbyterian Church.

Westminster Christian School had 330 students in preschool through 12th grade as of the 2019–2020 school year.

A special point of interest is the full 7 year Association of Christian Schools International accreditation that was given to WCS after their re-accreditation visit in the spring of 2006.

History

The school was founded in 1978. The high school wing was completed in 1999 and a gymnasium and additional classrooms to house the junior high program was completed in the spring of 2004. Westminster Christian High School's first senior class graduated in June 1997.

Administration
Debbie Layne, Elementary School Principal
Erik Schwartz, Middle and High School Principal

Athletics 
Westminster is part of the Illinois High School Association and competes in the Northeastern Athletic Conference.

Sports offered 
Westminster offers Boys' and Girls':
Soccer
Basketball
Baseball
Volleyball
American Football

State Championships 
 Baseball: 2009–2010

References 

Christian schools in Illinois
1978 establishments in Illinois
Educational institutions established in 1978
Elgin, Illinois
Private elementary schools in Illinois
Private middle schools in Illinois
Private high schools in Illinois
Schools in Kane County, Illinois